The Rugby League Tri-Nations final was the championship game in the Rugby League Tri-Nations tournament.  The tournament consisted of Australia, Great Britain, and New Zealand.

Results

See also

Rugby League Tri-Nations
Rugby League Four Nations

References

External links

Rugby League Tri-Nations
Rugby League Four Nations
Rugby league matches